Samuel Čentéš (born 19 February 1994) is a Slovak football forward who currently plays for the Corgoň Liga club AS Trenčín.

AS Trenčín
He made his debut for AS Trenčín against MFK Košice on 4 August 2012.

Career statistics

External links
AS Trenčín profile
Eurofotbal profile

References

1994 births
Living people
Slovak footballers
Association football forwards
AS Trenčín players
Slovak Super Liga players